Edna (minor planet designation: 445 Edna) is a large Main belt asteroid.

It was discovered by E. F. Coddington on October 2, 1899, at Mount Hamilton, California. It was the astronomer's third and final asteroid discovery.

References

External links
 
 

Background asteroids
Edna
Edna
C-type asteroids (Tholen)
18991002